The Collège de France, formerly known as the Collège Royal or as the Collège impérial founded in 1530 by François I, is a higher education and research establishment (grand établissement) in France. It is located in Paris near La Sorbonne. The Collège de France is considered to be France's most prestigious research establishment.
 
Research and teaching are closely linked at the Collège de France, whose ambition is to teach "the knowledge that is being built up in all fields of literature, science and the arts". 
It offers high-level courses that are free, non-degree-granting and open to all without condition or registration. This gives it a special place in the French intellectual landscape.

Overview
The Collège is considered to be France's most prestigious research establishment. As of 2021, 21 Nobel Prize winners and 9 Fields Medalists have been affiliated with the  Collège. It does not grant degrees. Each professor is required to give lectures where attendance is free and open to anyone. Professors, about 50 in number, are chosen by the professors themselves, from a variety of disciplines, in both science and the humanities.  The motto of the Collège is Docet Omnia, Latin for "It teaches everything"; its goal is to "teach science in the making" and can be best summed up by Maurice Merleau-Ponty's phrase: "Not acquired truths, but the idea of freely-executed research" which is inscribed in golden letters above the main hall. 

It is an associate member of University PSL.

The Collège has research laboratories and one of the best research libraries of Europe, with sections focusing on history with rare books, humanities, social sciences and also chemistry and physics. 

As of June 2009, over 650 audio podcasts of Collège de France lectures are available on iTunes. Some are also available in English and Chinese. Similarly, the Collège de France's website hosts several videos of classes.
The classes are followed by various students, from senior researchers to PhD or master students, or even bachelor students. Moreover, the "leçons inaugurales" (first lesson) are important events in Paris intellectual and social life and attract a very large public of curious Parisians.

History 
The Collège was established by King Francis I of France, modeled after the Collegium Trilingue in Louvain, at the urging of Guillaume Budé. Of humanist inspiration, the school was established as an alternative to the Sorbonne to promote such disciplines as Hebrew, Ancient Greek (the first teacher being the celebrated scholar Janus Lascaris) and Mathematics. Initially called Collège royal, and later Collège des trois langues (Latin, ancient Greek and Hebrew), Collège national, and Collège impérial, it was named Collège de France in 1870. In 2010, it became a founding associate of PSL Research University (a community of Parisian universities).

Administrators 

 1800-1823: Louis Lefèvre‑Gineau
 1824-1838: Antoine Isaac Silvestre de Sacy
 1838-1840: Louis Thénard
 1840-1848: Jean-Antoine Letronne
 1848-1852: Jules Barthélemy-Saint-Hilaire
 1852-1853: Xavier de Portets
 1853-1854: Jacques Rinn
 1854-1873: Stanislas Julien
 1873-1883: Édouard René de Laboulaye
 1883-1892: Ernest Renan
 1892-1894: Gaston Boissier
 1894-1903: Gaston Paris
 1903-1911: Émile Levasseur
 1911-1929: Maurice Croiset
 1929-1936: Joseph Bédier
 1937-1955: Edmond Faral
 1955-1965: Marcel Bataillon
 1966-1974: Étienne Wolff
 1974-1980: Alain Horeau
 1980-1991: Yves Laporte
 1991-1997: André Miquel
 1997-2000: Gilbert Dagron
 2000-2006: Jacques Glowinski
 2006-2012: Pierre Corvol
 2012-2015: Serge Haroche
 2015-2019: Alain Prochiantz
 Since 2019: Thomas Römer

Faculty

The faculty of the Collège de France currently comprises fifty-two Professors, elected by the Professors themselves from among Francophone scholars in subjects including mathematics, physics, chemistry, biology, history, archaeology, linguistics, oriental studies, philosophy, the social sciences and other fields. Two chairs are reserved for foreign scholars who are invited to give lectures. 

Notable faculty members include Serge Haroche, awarded with Nobel Prize in Physics in 2012. Notably, 8 Fields medal winners have been affiliated with the College.

Past faculty include:

 Raymond Aron
 Jean François Boissonade de Fontarabie
 Etienne Baluze
 Roland Barthes
 Simon Baudichon
 Émile Benveniste
 Henri Bergson
 Claude Bernard
 Marcelin Berthelot
 Yves Bonnefoy
 Pierre Boulez
 Pierre Bourdieu
 Jean-François Champollion
 Jean-Pierre Changeux
 Roger Chartier
 Anne Cheng
 Claude Cohen-Tannoudji
 Alain Connes
 Yves Coppens
 Georges Cuvier
 Marie Henri d'Arbois de Jubainville
 Jean Darcet
 Jacques-Arsène d'Arsonval
 Pierre-Gilles de Gennes
 Émile Deschanel
 Georges Duby
 Georges Dumézil
 Lucien Febvre
 Oronce Fine
 Michel Foucault
 Ferdinand André Fouqué
 Etienne Fourmont
 Marc Fumaroli
 Jean-Baptiste Gail
 Charles Gide
 Étienne Gilson 
 Jerzy Grotowski
 Martial Gueroult
 Ian Hacking
 Eugène Auguste Ernest Havet
 Barthélemy d'Herbelot
 Françoise Héritier
 Frédéric Joliot
 Alfred Jost
 Stanislas Julien
 René Labat
 Edouard Rene Lefebvre de Laboulaye
 Sylvestre François Lacroix
 René Laennec
 Paul Langevin
 Henri Lebesgue 
 René Leriche
 Emmanuel Le Roy Ladurie
 Claude Lévi-Strauss
 André Lichnerowicz
 Alfred Loisy
 Edmond Malinvaud
 Henri Maspero
 Louis Massignon
 Marcel Mauss
 Maurice Merleau-Ponty
 Jules Michelet
 Adam Mickiewicz
 Jean-Baptiste Morin
 Alexis Paulin Paris
 Paul Pelliot
 François Pétis de la Croix
 Guillaume Postel
 Edgar Quinet
 Petrus Ramus
 Henri Victor Regnault
 Jean-Pierre Abel-Rémusat
 Louis Robert
 Jean-Baptiste Say
 Victor Scialac
 Jean-Pierre Serre
 François Simiand
 Gabriel Sionita
 André Vaillant
 Paul Valéry
 François Vatable
 Jean-Pierre Vernant
 Claire Voisin
 Jules Vuillemin 
 Harald Weinrich
 Jean-Christophe Yoccoz
 Jean Yoyotte
 Don Zagier

See also
Institut de France
Raymond Couvègnes

References

External links

Collège de France website, English home page

 
Education in Paris
Grands établissements
1530 establishments in France
Educational institutions established in the 1530s
Buildings and structures in the 5th arrondissement of Paris